Ioane (Ioane Mukhranbatoni) (12 December 1755 – 1 October 1801) was a Georgian diplomat and military commander. As the head of the Mukhrani branch of the royal Bagrationi dynasty of Kartli, he was Prince (batoni) of Mukhrani and ex officio commander of the Banner of Shida Kartli and Grand Master of the Household (msakhurt-ukhutsesi) at the court of Georgia from 1778 to 1801.

Biography  
Ioane was a son of Prince Constantine III of Mukhrani. He succeeded to the headship of the House of Mukhrani on the retirement of his relative, Simon. He was a son-in-law and senior official of King Heraclius II of Georgia. In 1783, Ioane signed, together with Prince Garsevan Chavchavadze, the Treaty of Georgievsk whereby Georgia was promised a Russian protection and preservation of its throne under the House of Bagrationi. From 1786 to 1795, he was a military governor of the Erivan Khanate, Georgia's tributary state. He was responsible for putting down a revolt against Heraclius' hegemony in the Nakhichevan Khanate in 1786 and commanded elements of Georgian troops at the disastrous battle against the Iranian invasion of Tbilisi in 1795.

Family  
Prince Ioane was married to Princess Ketevan of Georgia, daughter of King Heraclius II. They had 7 children: 
Constantine IV of Mukhrani (1782–1842)
Teimuraz Bagration of Mukhrani (1784–1833)
Grigol Bagration of Mukhrani (1787–1861)
Barbare Bagration of Mukhrani (1790–1843)
David Bagration of Mukhrani (1793–1878)
Tamar Bagration of Mukhrani (1798–1851)
Irakli Bagration of Mukhrani (1800–1816)

References

1755 births
1801 deaths
House of Mukhrani
Diplomats of Georgia (country)
Generals from Georgia (country)